HSwMS Sälen (Sä), (Swedish for "Seal") was the second Hajen-class submarine of the Swedish Navy.

Construction and career 
HSwMS Sälen was launched on 3 October 1955 by Saab Kockums, Malmö and commissioned on 8 April 1957.

She was decommissioned on 1 July 1980 and later scrapped in Gävle in 1990.

Gallery

References 

Hajen-class submarines
Ships built in Malmö
1955 ships